Björn Arne Christer Wahlroos (born 10 October 1952 in Helsinki, Finland) is a Swedish-speaking Finn, best known as a banker, investor and the chairman of the Board in Sampo Group and UPM-Kymmene. Before switching to banking Wahlroos worked as a professor at the Hanken School of Economics in Helsinki. Wahlroos holds a Doctorate in the field of Economics from the Hanken School of Economics.

In terms of political economical viewpoint, Björn Wahlroos is known as a defender of laissez-faire economics, a fighter against Keynesian economics and economic regulation. His views against government interference and regulation has prompted criticism and controversy throughout the years, as despite Wahlroos' wealth, he has collected hundreds of thousands of euros in Finnish agricultural subsidies.

He owns a mansion in Salo in Finland and a second mansion in Nice in France in addition an apartment in Stockholm. Wahlroos has also published several books on economics and the Finnish economy.

His father Bror "Bunta" Wahlroos was chief of staff in the Ministry of Trade and Industry. His mother, Marita Wahlroos, is a long-time friend of Martti Ahtisaari, president of Finland (1994–2000) and they both worked in Africa.

Personal life and family 
Wahlroos' father Bror "Buntta" Wahlroos (1928-2007) was a well-known economist, who worked at the Finnish Ministry of Trade and Industry from the 1960s until his retirement in 1993. Bror Wahlroos was the Chief of Staff of the ministry for a total of 23 years. Wahlroos' mother, Marita Wahlroos also held a master's degree in economics. Marita Wahlroos worked as a teacher at a business school in Helsinki for several years. After Marita divorced Bror, she worked in numerous African countries in the developmental aid sector.

Björn Wahlroos married Saara Wahlroos in 1977. They have two children, Nina Wahlroos-Grader (b. 1977) and Thomas Wahlroos (b. 1979). Wahlroos has transferred sums of his wealth to his children, partially to avoid the Finnish inheritance tax and other taxes.

Career 
After graduation from the gymnasium Nya svenska samskolan in 1971 Björn Wahlroos studied at the Hanken School of Economics in Helsinki. He graduated as a M.Sc. in 1975 and got his D.Sc. in 1979. The following years were spent in academia; as an acting professor of economics at the Hanken School of Economics in Helsinki and as a visiting professor at Brown University and the Kellogg School of Management at Northwestern University, Illinois, United States.

In 1985 Wahlroos switched career to banking, joining the executive board of Union Bank of Finland (Suomen Yhdyspankki). In 1988 he was appointed Executive vice president and Head of Investment Banking & Treasury at the Union Bank of Finland. Together with half a dozen of his colleagues Wahlroos bought out the investment banking operations of UBF in 1992 and started the partnership Mandatum & Co, which soon became the leading advisor of mergers and acquisitions in Scandinavia. Through a merger with Interbank in 1998 Mandatum was listed on the Helsinki Stock Exchange.

In 2000 Wahlroos merged his banking group into Sampo-Leonia and took over as president and CEO of the combined company, also becoming its biggest private shareholder. In 2009 Wahlroos resigned as CEO and was elected Chairman of Sampo plc, holding company of Sampo Group, which by then had become the biggest insurer in Northern Europe and also the main shareholder of Nordea, the region's largest bank. Between 2011 and 2019 he was chairman of the board of Nordea.

Wahlroos is also chairman of the Board of UPM-Kymmene, the pulp and paper manufacturer.

In late 2022, Wahlroos transferred the ownership in his main investment companies, worth  EUR 130m, to his children, in preparation for his planned retirement from daily business activities.

Politics 

While a student, Wahlroos was involved in left-wing politics. He was a member of Finlands Svenska Skolungdomsförbundet in 1969–1973 and communist revolutionary student association Sosialistiset taloustieteen opiskelijat in 1971–1973. He left extreme leftist politics in 1973. After this he has withdrawn from active party politics although he is a paying member of the Swedish People's Party. He has nevertheless given public comments that give an indication of his thoughts.

In 2001, he declared himself in favour of a citizen's income in Finland. "Basic security, in my mind, must never be threatened because it is an important part of human modern society", Wahlroos said in the Finnish newspaper Uutispäivä Demari, clearing way to negative income tax thinking. In March 2009 Wahlroos predicted that the economic recession would not endure for long, because the market corrects itself quickly. In March 2010, in an interview in Image magazine, he spoke of the need to cut Finnish development aid because "we have 50 years of money thrown into a bottomless well". In addition, he has criticized giving grants to university students because it, according to Wahlroos, "supports idleness", and regards agricultural and forestry research expenditures as excessive. In June 2010 Wahlroos told the Financial Times that Europe will have to reconsider the future of the Social market economy model, because people cannot be taxed in the future in the current fashion, and poverty and broken families are unsustainable. Wahlroos also believes that agricultural subsidies should be abolished throughout the world: "It is absurd that Finland is with one hand supporting the Zambian agribusiness and the other the EU common agricultural policy. (...) ...giving to developing countries at the same time ... when the EU is to abolish agricultural subsidies and open tariff barriers on agricultural products." At the same time he receives remarkable agricultural subsidies himself.

In 2015 Wahlroos published a book defending his laissez-faire economics viewpoint, De tio sämsta ekonomiska teorierna. Från Keynes till Piketty (The ten worst economic theories: From Keynes to Piketty). In the book he argues, for instance, that stable economic development is difficult to implement in a democratic social system.

Wahlroos is a member of Libera, a foundation organized under Mont Pelerin Society.

Military 

In the Finnish Defence Forces, Wahlroos holds the rank of major in the reserves.

Books published 
Wahlroos, Björn: Markkinat ja demokratia. (Otava, 2012) 

Wahlroos, Björn: Talouden kymmenen tuhoisinta ajatusta. (Otava, 2015) 

Wahlroos, Björn: Kuinkas tässä näin kävi? (Otava, 2019) 

Wahlroos, Björn: Barrikaadeilta pankkimaailmaan (Otava, 2021)

References

Sources
Personal data: Corresponding article on the Finnish Wikipedia

External links

Sampo Board of Directors

1952 births
Living people
Swedish-speaking Finns
Businesspeople from Helsinki
Finnish bankers
Finnish expatriates in France
Finnish expatriates in Sweden
Academic staff of the Hanken School of Economics